Surriya Naseem (born 10 November 1967) is a Pakistani politician who was a Member of the Provincial Assembly of the Punjab, from February 2007 to November 2007 and again from May 2013 to May 2018.

Early life and education
She was born on 10 November 1967 in Faisalabad.

She earned the degree of Master of Arts in Urdu from Murray College in 1989. She also received the degrees of Bachelor of Education in 1990 and Master of Arts in Islamiat in 1998, both from the University of the Punjab.

Political career
She was elected to the Provincial Assembly of the Punjab in February 2007, where he served until November 2007.

She was re-elected to the Provincial Assembly of the Punjab as a candidate of Pakistan Muslim League (N) on a reserved seat for women in 2013 Pakistani general election.

References

Living people
Women members of the Provincial Assembly of the Punjab
Punjab MPAs 2013–2018
Punjab MPAs 2002–2007
1967 births
Pakistan Muslim League (N) politicians
Politicians from Faisalabad
21st-century Pakistani women politicians